The New Right (Korean: 뉴라이트 nyulaiteu) movement in South Korean politics is a school of political thought which developed as a reaction against the traditional divide between conservatives (the "old right") and progressives. The New Right broke from past conservatives, who supported state intervention in the economy, by promoting neoliberal ideas. Many figures of the New Right have also become notable for criticising anti-Japanese sentiment in South Korea. Opponents of the New Right movement described this as anti-leftism, military dictatorship advocates, pro-sadaejuui, and "pro-Japanese identity".

History 
Before the era of democratisation, South Korea had been ruled almost continuously by a series of dictatorships, such as those of Park Chung-hee and Chun Doo-hwan. These regimes were characterised by stringent anti-communism, authoritarianism, and state capitalism, and as a result these attributes came to be seen as hallmarks of the older generation of Korean conservatives. After 1987, following democratisation, conservatives adapted and modified their previous positions in order to counteract the rising successes of left-wing activism in South Korean politics. For instance, the Democratic Justice Party pivoted away from authoritarianism under Roh Tae-woo, successor of Chun Doo-hwan, by promising that the election of 1987 would be fair and democratic.

Nonetheless, the conservative parties of the old style continued to hold a negative association with corruption of the past for many, and throughout the 1990s and into the early 2000s, progressivism characterised by support for social liberalism and a soft attitude towards North Korea became dominant in politics. As a result of this, a number of reform-minded right-wing groups known as the "New Right" developed in the 2000s as a reaction to the ascendency of these progressives, whose ideology they considered harmful. Like the old conservatives, they opposed left-wing economic policies and a soft attitude toward North Korea. However, they also attempted to distance themselves from the sins of the older right-wing, which they viewed as stagnant and out-of-touch. Describing themselves as "rational conservatives," these groups expressed a more flexible attitude towards North Korea through a willingness to recognise it as a separate country and to provide humanitarian aid for the citizens of North Korea. However, they balanced this with an anti-communist attitude and a support for free-market economic policies. They also rejected the totalitarianism of the past and placed an emphasis on civil rights and liberty; overall, their views were associated with classical liberalism.

Initially, these "New Right" groups contained many figures connected to the traditional conservative establishment and as a result they struggled to differentiate themselves from old-school conservatives for a time. This could be seen following the victory of conservative Lee Myung-bak in the 2007 presidential election; Lee's administration succeeded in replacing many progressive members of government-affiliated deliberative and advisory committees with members of "New Right" organisations. Lee's successor, Park Geun-hye (the eldest daughter of dictator Park Chung-hee), continued to maintain close relationships with these modern conservative social groups, even as her administration displayed an antagonistic attitude towards anti-government demonstrations and labor strikes.

Unlike the moderate early New Right movement in the 2000s, the New Right movement has become increasingly extreme since the 2010s. Some New Right scholars have come under criticism for supporting the historical revisionist and extreme right-wing view of Gwangju Uprising.

Political views
The New Right's view of modern and contemporary Korean history is known to be contrary to the view of progressive Korean nationalists. The New Right movement is led by descendants of those who collaborated with the Japanese imperialism and Shōwa Statism during the time when Korea was a Japanese colony.

New Right scholars try to promote pro-American and pro-Japanese sentiment among South Koreans. South Korea's New Rightists have a strong anti-communist perception of North Korea and a favorable perception of Japan, an ally with the United States, because they have a stronger pro-American sentiment than liberal-to-progressives. According to South Korean political experts, the New Right movement is based on the Korean traditional conservative sadaejuui sentiment.

Criticism

New Right movement has often been criticized by many South Korean media and experts for being "reactionary" (반동) or "far-right" (극우). 

There is a controversy that New Right scholars support the colonialist view of Japanese people. New Right scholars have been criticized socially for accepting Japanese historical revisionism for Japanese war crimes. Even Hong Joon-pyo, known as a hard-line conservative, criticized New Rightist perception of history. Yuji Hosaka, a non-Korean Japanese-born naturalized South Korean, accused New Right of being a Sin-Chinilpa in support of Japanese far-right. He accused South Korean New Right scholars of sympathizing with Nippon Kaigi's view of history. Lee Woo-yeon (이우연), co-author of Anti-Japan Tribalism, was funded by a Japanese far-right groups (일본 극우단체), according to a report by the Kyunghyang Shinmun.

According to political commentator Chin Jung-kwon said, "Japanese far-right poitics is 'sadistic' (가학적) and South Korean far-right poitics is 'masochistic' (피학적)", and "the 'colonialist historical perspective' (식민사관) is a 'political sadomasochism' (정치적 사도마조히즘) directed by Japanese and South Korean far-right as sex partners".

Activism

Historiography 
One aspect of the New Right that has been highly notable is the recent production of historical studies by New Right-oriented academics which seek to oppose traditional Korean views of history. Some of these best-selling books argue against the overwhelmingly negative view of Imperial Japan and also dispute specific details about the comfort women discussion. Some of these authors also suggest that Japan helped Korea to modernise, both politically and economically. Unsurprisingly, these positions have sparked intense debate in South Korean society.

Conservative education
Some well-known politicians from the "old right" GNP indicated commonality with the New Right groups, including Park Geun-hye endorse the anti-North Korean New Right's version of alternative Korean History textbooks through a foundation called Text Book Forum. The Lee Myung-bak government's Ministry of Education, Science and Technology has tried to implant the next Korean New Right version of Korean history textbook for the public school usage. The NR's groups' demanding pressure to use their hawkish Korean history textbooks has eventually make them inconsistently incompatible with the dovish ethics textbooks. New Right establishments also often oppose the left-leaning Korean Teachers and Education Workers Union.

Media
  Gyegan Sidaejeongsin (계간 시대정신)
  New Daily (뉴데일리)

Organizations
  New Right National Union
   Sidaejeongsin

Members
An Byeong-jik
Cho Jun-hyuk
Lee Young-hoon
Lee Woo-yeon (이우연)
Park Yu-ha
Shin Ji-ho
Hong Jin-pyo (홍진표)

See also
Anti-nationalism - In Korea politics, there is a political tradition that rightist oppose resistance-nationalism and leftists support resistance-nationalism.
Colonialism
Conservatism in South Korea
Neo-reactionary movement
Sadaejuui - It is Korean Confucian trandition.
Pinochetism
Social Darwinism

Notes

References

Conservatism in South Korea
Anti-communism in South Korea
Anti-Korean sentiment
Anti-nationalism in Korea
Classical liberalism
Dark Enlightenment
Far-right politics in South Korea
Japanese imperialism and colonialism
Libertarianism in Asia
Neocolonialism
Neoliberalism
Nippon Kaigi
Paleolibertarianism
Political movements in South Korea
Politics of South Korea
Reactionary
Sadaejuui